Below is the Russian list of terrorist and extremist organizations.

Terrorist organizations
 the list of organizations, both domestic and foreign, are designated as terrorist according to the Law of the Russian Federation is:

Extremist organizations 

  Meta/Facebook/Instagram - in March 2022 a Moscow court recognized Meta as an extremist organization.

Monitoring 
Rosfinmonitoring (Russian Federal Financial Monitoring Service) maintains searchable lists of organizations and persons, domestic and foreign, for which it has information about their association with extremist and terrorist activities.

See also
Federal List of Extremist Materials
List of organisations banned in Russia

References

Organizations designated as terrorist by Russia
Terrorism-related lists
Terrorist and extremist organizations